Thomas William Hanforth FRCO (6 March 1867 – 5 June 1948) was a composer and organist based in England.

Life
He was a chorister in York Minster and studied organ under W. H. Garland and the minster organist John Naylor. He was awarded a MusB from Durham University.

In 1892 he succeeded Edwin Lemare as organist of Sheffield Parish Church, which was upgraded to cathedral status in 1914.

During his time in Sheffield, he was appointed Sheffield City Organist in 1932.

Appointments
 Organist to Archbishop William Thompson of York 1885–1888
 Music Master at the Yorkshire School for the Blind 1888–1892
 Assistant organist at York Minster 1891–1892
 Organist at Sheffield Cathedral 1892–1937
 Conductor of the Sheffield Philharmonic Orchestra 1911–1914
 Organist to the Grand Lodge of England 1923–1924, and 1937–1938

Compositions
His compositions include works for organ, choir and songs.

References

1867 births
1948 deaths
English organists
British male organists
English composers
Alumni of Durham University
English conductors (music)
British male conductors (music)
Composers for pipe organ